Bova is a fictional character appearing in American comic books published by Marvel Comics.

Publication history

Bova first appeared in Giant-Size Avengers #1 and was created by Roy Thomas and Rich Buckler.

Fictional character biography
Bova is one of the New Men (creatures genetically engineered by the High Evolutionary) where she was uplifted from a Guernsey cattle.

A woman named Magda—pregnant with twins Pietro Maximoff and Wanda Maximoff—takes sanctuary at Mount Wundagore in Transia, the home of the High Evolutionary, after seeing her husband Magnus use his magnetic powers for the first time. Fearing that Magnus would discover the children, Magda leaves the sanctuary and dies of exposure to the elements. The twins are attended by Bova. Bova soon assists the World War II superheroine Miss America through labor, but the birth results in a stillborn child and Miss America loses her own life in the process.  Bova hides the truth from her husband Robert Frank and claims that only the mother has died, and that he now has twin children. Frank is shocked at the death of his wife and flees at super speed. Bova therefore serves as the foster mother to Pietro and Wanda. She was also used by the High Evolutionary to raise and nurture the young New Men as their nanny.

Wanda and Pietro—as adults, now known as the superheroes the Scarlet Witch and Quicksilver—are abducted by Django Maximoff and taken to Wundagore. Wanda is temporarily possessed by the demon Chthon, but after being released is advised by Bova that neither Frank nor Maximoff is their biological father. Modred the Mystic had been under Chthon's control, and with Chthon's defeat Modred was mentally damaged by the battle, and was left with the intellect of a child. He lost his sanity and knowledge of magic, and was left in the care of Bova.

During the limited series Vision and the Scarlet Witch, Magneto forces Bova to reveal the truth about his missing children, who are revealed to be Pietro and Wanda. When Magneto injured Bova and destroyed her cottage, Modred wandered away, subconsciously seeking his native England.

After the High Evolutionary nearly lost his life at the hands of the Man-Beast, New Men Delphis and Bova assist the Evolutionary and he was able to restore himself to an un-evolved human state and mental stability using Isotope G.

Bova also serves as a nanny for Jessica Drew as revealed in Spider-Woman: Origin.

When the High Evolutionary saw the Celestials coming to Earth to judge it, Lady Bova is among the New Men that the High Evolutionary exterminated.

Powers and abilities
Bova possesses dense horns, has a solid frame, and possesses some degree of super-strength.

Bova's skills include cooking, nursing, and caretaking.

In other media
Bova appears in the X-Men episode "Family Ties". After Quicksilver and Scarlet Witch learned from their Roma foster parents that she's the one who asked them to raise the twins, the two came to Wundagore to find her in hopes to learn more about their origins, and she reveals that Magneto is responsible for their mother's death.

During the opening for Episode 2 of WandaVision, there is a brand of milk at the grocery store Wanda is at called "Bova Milk".

References

External links
 

Fictional genetically engineered characters
Marvel Comics characters
Marvel Comics characters with superhuman strength
Transians